The Spanish Jade is a 1922 British silent drama film directed by John S. Robertson. Alfred Hitchcock is credited as a title designer. The film is considered to be lost. It was shot at Islington Studios in London by the British subsidiary of Paramount Pictures. The story had previously been made into a 1915 film of the same title.

Cast
 David Powell as Gil Pérez
 Marc McDermott as Don Luis Ramónez de Alavia
 Charles de Rochefort as Esteban
 Evelyn Brent as Mañuela
 Lionel d'Aragon as Mañuela's Stepfather
 Frank Stanmore as Tormillo, Don Luis' servant
 Roy Byford as Esteban's Spy and Confident
 Harry Ham as Oswald Manvers

See also
 Alfred Hitchcock filmography
 The Spanish Jade (1915)
 List of lost films

References

Bibliography
 Low, Rachael. The History of the British Film 1918-1929. George Allen & Unwin, 1971.

External links

1922 films
1922 drama films
1922 lost films
British silent feature films
British black-and-white films
British drama films
British remakes of American films
Films directed by John S. Robertson
Films shot in Spain
Islington Studios films
Lost British films
Paramount Pictures films
Lost drama films
1920s British films
Silent drama films